Manfred Christopher Waller (born September 20, 1968 in Evanston, Illinois) is a retired American gymnast who competed in the 1990 Goodwill Games, and the 1992 Summer Olympics.

From 2020 to 2022, he was the head coach for the UCLA Bruins gymnastics team; his alma mater.

References

1968 births
Living people
Olympic gymnasts of the United States
Gymnasts at the 1992 Summer Olympics
sportspeople from Evanston, Illinois
Pan American Games medalists in gymnastics
Pan American Games gold medalists for the United States
Gymnasts at the 1995 Pan American Games
Competitors at the 1990 Goodwill Games
UCLA Bruins men's gymnasts
UCLA Bruins coaches